Hannah Lynn Haughn (born September 4, 1994, in Vancouver, British Columbia) is a female field hockey player, who played for the Canada national field hockey team as a midfielder at the 2014 Commonwealth Games.

Haughn represented Canada at the 2015 Pan American Games where the team won a bronze medal. She was also a member of the team at the 2019 Pan American Games where they won a silver medal.

References

External links
 
 
 
 
 
 Hannah Lynn Haughn at the Lima 2019 Pan American Games

1994 births
Living people
Canadian female field hockey players
Field hockey players from Vancouver
Commonwealth Games competitors for Canada
Field hockey players at the 2014 Commonwealth Games
Field hockey players at the 2011 Pan American Games
Field hockey players at the 2015 Pan American Games
Pan American Games bronze medalists for Canada
Pan American Games medalists in field hockey
Pan American Games silver medalists for Canada
Field hockey players at the 2019 Pan American Games
Medalists at the 2015 Pan American Games
Medalists at the 2019 Pan American Games
Field hockey players at the 2022 Commonwealth Games
20th-century Canadian women
21st-century Canadian women